Eduardo Paniagua (born 1952 in Madrid, Spain) is a Spanish architect and musician, specializing in medieval Spanish music.

Between 1966 and 1983, he was a member of the group Atrium Musicae de Madrid, led by his older brother Gregorio, playing wind instruments and percussion. More recently he has been a founding member of the groups Cálamus and Hoquetus which specialize in the music of Al-Andalus (Arabic Andalusia).

In 1994, he created the group Música Antigua to perform and record the Cantigas de Santa Maria. In the same year he also founded the group Ibn Báya Ensemble together with the oud player Omar Metioui, for the performance and recording of Andalusian music. Other regular collaborators include Moroccan singers Said Belcadi, Mohammed El-Arabi Serghini, and the Algerian oud player Salim Fergani.

Paniagua also founded and currently manages the record label Pneuma through which he has published a number of his own recordings. Some of the recordings are reissues of earlier Sony Hispánica recordings, or compilations from other Pneuma recordings.

Discography 
With Atrium Musicæ de Madrid: (dir. Gregorio Paniagua): 
La Folía (Harmonia Mundi)
La Spagna (BIS)
Musique de la Grèce Antique (Harmonia Mundi)
Antología de Música Antigua Española

With Música Antigua:
PN 010 Cantigas de Toledo (was Sony Hispánica 62264)
PN 020 Cantigas de Castilla y León  (was Sony Hispánica 62265)
PN 210	Cantigas de Castilla-La Mancha 	
PN 220	Cantigas – Santa Maria del Puerto vol. I 	
PN 240	Cantigas – Remedios Curativos (was Sony "Hispánica" 62263)
PN 280	Cantigas de Madrid : Virgen de Atocha
PN 340	Cantigas de Animales – Bestiario
PN 400	Cantigas de Flauta y Tamboril
PN 420	Cantigas de Extremadura
PN 490	Cantigas – Caballeros (was  Sony "Hispánica" 63018)
PN 510	Cantigas de Italia  (was  Sony "Hispánica" 60843)
PN 520	Cantigas de Francia  (was  Sony "Hispánica" 60842)
PN 540 Morada del Corazón: Sefarad en al-Andalus, siglos XI–XII (2003)	
PN 570	Cantigas de Jerez  (was Sony "Hispánica" 60080)
PN 590	Cantigas de Sevilla (2 CDs) (was Sony "Hispánica" 62859)
PN 610	Cantigas – La Vida de Maria (2CD)
PN 680	Cantigas – El Camino de Santiago en las Cantigas de Alfonso X el Sabio
PN 700 Rosa de las rosas (compilation)
PN 720 Llena de gracia (compilation)
PN 730 Santa María, estrela del día (compilation)
PN 740	Cantigas de Viola de Rueda
Obras Maestras de las Cantigas (compilation)
PN 820 Cantigas celtas - Merlin
PN 860 Cantigas de Valencia
PN 880 Cantigas de Bizancio (2CD)
PN 980 Cantigas de Catalunya, 2008
PN 990 Cantigas de Inglaterra, 2008
PN1080 Cantigas de Burgos, 2009
PN1090 Cantigas de Alemania, 2009
PN1150 Cantigas de Flandes, 2010
PN1170 Cantigas Del Mar Cantábrico 2010
PN1230 Cantigas de Mujeres 2011
PN1280 Cantigas de Nuestro Señor 2011
PN1380 Cantigas Centenales 2013
PN1490 Cantigas de Roma 2014
PN1510 Cantigas de Alejandría 2015
PN1530	Cantigas de Ultramar 2CD 2016
PN1540	Cantigas de Jerusalen 2017
PN1560	Cantigas de Murcia 2017

With Ensemble Ibn Baya:
Jardín de Al-Andalus
Walladah (Córdoba 994-1077) and Ibn Zaygun (Córdoba 1003-1071)
La Llamada de Al-Andalus
Núba Al-Maya
Ibn Arabi
El Agua de la Alhambra
La Felicidad Cumplida
Nuba Al-Istihlal
Poemas de la Alhambra
Alarifes Mudéjares

With Ensemble Cálamus:
The Splendour of Al-Andalus
Medieval Women's songs

Various ensembles:
Danzas medievales españolas
Tres culturas: judios, moros y cristianos en la España medieval
Luz de la Mediterranía
Sepharad
Música Européa del siglo XV para el Organo de papel de Leonardo da Vinci
Ecos del Espíritu. Melodías Gregorianas
El Cantar de la Conquista de Almería

Books
PN770 Rumi-Ibn Arabí (libro-disco Almuzara) (Rumi, Ibn Arabi)
PN960 Rabindranath Tagore (libro-disco Almuzara) (Rabindranath Tagore)
PN1030 Ibn Gabirol. Caballero de la Palabra (libro-disco Almuzara) (Ibn Gabirol)

References

External links 
 Biography & partial discography
Cantigas - complete discography

1952 births
Living people
Performers of medieval music
Spanish performers of early music
Spanish architects
Musicians from Madrid